Freddie Roman (born Fred Kirschenbaum; May 28, 1937 – November 26, 2022) was an American stand-up comedian, best known for his frequent appearances at "Borscht Belt" hotels.

Early life 
Freddie Roman grew up in Jamaica, New York. His father was a shoe salesman. His uncle and grandfather owned the Crystal Spring Hotel in the Catskills. There, Freddie was given a chance to emcee on summer nights at age 15. He became a teenage comic in small resorts, but later left show business to work for his father. He became the proprietor of a ladies' shoe store, but soon realized his true love was "not in shoe business, but show business".

Career 
Roman headlined at resort venues, including Caesars Palace on the Las Vegas Strip and Harrah's Atlantic City. He continued to perform, well into his later years.

The Friars Club changed their two-term maximum bylaw so Roman could stay on as its dean.  He was, ultimately, succeeded by Larry King, who was the next dean of The Friars Club.

Roman co-wrote, and starred in, the stage show Catskills on Broadway, as well as appearing in several films.

Personal life and death 
Roman resided in Boynton Beach, Florida.

His son was Alan Kirschenbaum, a television producer, who died in 2012. Roman died in Boynton Beach on November 26, 2022, at the age of 85.

Filmography

Films 
Welcome to Kutsher's: The Last Catskills Resort (2012)
The Last Laugh (2006)
Bittersweet Place (2005)
Christ in the City (2005)
Finding North (1998)
Sweet Lorraine (1987)

Television appearances 
The Big Room for MTV's Ha!
Friars Club Roasts
Funny Already: A History of Jewish Comedy
Law & Order: Criminal Intent
Now That's Funny!
Stark Raving Mad
The Tonight Show Starring Johnny Carson
The 46th Annual Tony Awards (presenter)
Red Oaks (Amazon.com) - 18 episodes

Stage 
Catskills on Broadway (2003)
Sunrise Lakes Phase IV (2010)

References

External links 
Freddie Roman's Early Career and interview

Freddie Roman: Still Roasting After All These Years
Friars Club
 

1937 births
2022 deaths 
People from Queens, New York
American stand-up comedians
American male film actors
American male television actors
People from Fort Lee, New Jersey
Jewish American comedians
Comedians from New York (state)
Jewish American male comedians
21st-century American Jews